The ileal branch of ileocolic artery is a branch of the ileocolic artery.

Arteries of the abdomen